Lorde (born 1996) is a New Zealand singer-songwriter.

Lorde may also refer to:
"Lorde", an archaic form of Lord

People with the surname
Audre Lorde (1934–1992), American writer and civil rights activist
André de Lorde (1869–1942), French playwright, known for the Grand Guignol

See also
Lord (disambiguation)
Lordi, Finnish hard rock band